The 2019 O'Reilly Auto Parts 500 was a Monster Energy NASCAR Cup Series race that was held on March 31, 2019, at Texas Motor Speedway in Fort Worth, Texas. Contested over 334 laps on the 1.5-mile (2.4 km) intermediate quad-oval, it was the seventh race of the 2019 Monster Energy NASCAR Cup Series season.

Report

Background

Texas Motor Speedway is a speedway located in the northernmost portion of the U.S. city of Fort Worth, Texas – the portion located in Denton County, Texas. The track measures  around and is banked 24 degrees in the turns, and is of the oval design, where the front straightaway juts outward slightly. The track layout is similar to Atlanta Motor Speedway and Charlotte Motor Speedway (formerly Lowe's Motor Speedway). The track is owned by Speedway Motorsports, Inc., the same company that owns Atlanta and Charlotte Motor Speedways, as well as the short-track Bristol Motor Speedway.

Entry list

First practice

Qualifying

Qualifying results

Practice (post-qualifying)

Second practice
Second practice session scheduled for Saturday was cancelled due to rain.

Final practice

Race

Stage Results

Stage One
Laps: 85

Stage Two
Laps: 85

Final Stage Results

Stage Three

Laps: 164

Race statistics
 Lead changes: 26 among 13 different drivers
 Cautions/Laps: 5 for 29
 Red flags: 0
 Time of race: 3 hours, 16 minutes and 11 seconds
 Average speed:

Media

Television
Fox Sports covered their 19th race at the Texas Motor Speedway. Mike Joy, 2009 race winner Jeff Gordon and Darrell Waltrip had the call in the booth for the race. Jamie Little, Vince Welch and Matt Yocum handled the pit road duties for the television side.

Radio
The race was broadcast on radio by the Performance Racing Network and simulcast on Sirius XM NASCAR Radio.

Standings after the race

Drivers' Championship standings

Manufacturers' Championship standings

Note: Only the first 16 positions are included for the driver standings.
. – Driver has clinched a position in the Monster Energy NASCAR Cup Series playoffs.

References

O'Reilly Auto Parts 500
O'Reilly Auto Parts 500
2010s in Fort Worth, Texas
O'Reilly Auto Parts 500
NASCAR races at Texas Motor Speedway